Margaret Louise Swett Henson (January 3, 1924 – January 22, 2001) was a historian, archivist, and author specializing in 19th-century Texas history.

Biography
Born Margaret Louise Swett on January 3, 1924, to William Claude and Clara (née Kaufman) Swett in Chicago, she was raised near Chicago and attended Glenbard High School. She enrolled at the University of Texas in 1941, but did not graduate.  Henson earned her bachelor’s degree from the University of Houston in 1962, her master’s degree in 1969, and her doctorate in history in 1974. She was an archivist and taught history at the University of Houston–Clear Lake. Henson’s research and writing focused on the Texas Revolution and the Republic of Texas.

Henson was a member of the Tejano Association for Historic Preservation.

Henson married twice. She married Bill Nowotny in 1943, a union which produced two daughters. Margaret and Bill divorced about seven years later. She married J. Scott Henson in 1951. They had three sons. Henson died on January 22, 2001, and was interred at Memorial Oaks Cemetery, Houston.

Selected works

References

External links
 

University of Houston alumni
University of Houston faculty
American archivists
American women historians
1924 births
2001 deaths
American women biographers
Texas State Historical Association presidents
20th-century American historians
20th-century American biographers
21st-century American women writers
Writers from Chicago
Historians from Illinois
Historians of Texas
Female archivists